CoRoT-8b is a transiting exoplanet orbiting the K-type main sequence star CoRoT-8 1,050 light years away in the equatorial constellation Aquila. The planet was discovered in April 2010 by the CoRoT telescope.

Discovery
This planet was discovered using the transit method, which detects planet via eclipses. The discovery paper's abstract states that CoRoT-8b is extremely dense compared to Saturn.

Properties
CoRoT-8b has 21.8% Jupiter's mass, and due to its close orbit, a radius 61.9% that of Jupiter. This classifies the planet as a hot Saturn. Despite the bloated radius, the planet is extremely dense, with it being 1.1 times greater than water's;CoRoT-8b has a temperature of 870 K from its 6-day orbit.

References

Hot Jupiters
Transiting exoplanets
Exoplanets discovered in 2010
8b
Aquila (constellation)